Suchira Paranathala (born 13 April 1995) is a Sri Lankan cricketer. He made his List A debut on 26 March 2021, for Sebastianites Cricket and Athletic Club in the 2020–21 Major Clubs Limited Over Tournament.

References

External links
 

1995 births
Living people
Sri Lankan cricketers
Sebastianites Cricket and Athletic Club cricketers
Place of birth missing (living people)